Modern Homemakers was an early American television series, making its debut on June 27, 1951, on five stations of the CBS television network in the eastern United States. This half-hour daytime program (10:30-11:00 a.m., EDT) was broadcast from New York Monday through Friday. It was hosted by home economist Edalene Stohr, who during the first episode quipped, "Color television's wonderful, but it will really be something when we develop it to bring you the aromas of the dishes, too."

Modern Homemakers was broadcast in the CBS field-sequential color system that was incompatible with existing black and white television sets, on which no picture would be visible. Only a small number of prototype color television sets existed on which the program could be seen. It was last broadcast on August 17, 1951.

References

1951 American television series debuts
1951 American television series endings
1950s American television series
CBS original programming